Northern Rhodesia (now Zambia) competed in the Summer Olympic Games for the first time at the 1964 Summer Olympics in Tokyo, Japan. 12 competitors, 11 men and 1 woman, took part in 13 events in 5 sports. These were the only Games for Northern Rhodesia. On 24 October 1964 (the same day as the closing ceremony), the country became independent from the UK and changed its name from Northern Rhodesia to Zambia, the first time a country entered an Olympic games as one country and left it as another.  For that ceremony, the team celebrated by marching with a new placard with the word "Zambia" on it (as opposed to the "Northern Rhodesia" placard used in the opening ceremony). They were the only team to use a placard for the closing ceremony.

Athletics

Men
Track & road events

Boxing

Men

Fencing

One female fencer represented Northern Rhodesia in 1964.

Women's foil
 Patricia Skinner

Swimming

Men

Wrestling

Men's Freestyle

References

External links
Official Olympic Reports

Nations at the 1964 Summer Olympics
1964
1964 Summer Olympics
1964 in Zambia